Dennis Eugene Breedlove (14 September 1939, Oakland, California – 4 June 2012) was an American botanist, herbarium curator, and plant collector. He is "best known for his collections and floristic studies in the Mexican state of Chiapas, and his ethnobotanical work in that state with various collaborators."

Education and career
After graduating from St. Joseph Notre Dame High School in 1957, Dennis Breedlove attended the University of California, Santa Barbara, where he graduated with an A.B. degree in 1962. In 1968 he graduated from Stanford University with a Ph.D. His doctoral dissertation, entitled "The systematics of Fuchsia section Encliandra (Onagraceae)", was written under the supervision of Peter H. Raven. After briefly working as a research botanist at the University of California Botanical Garden on the Berkeley campus, Breedlove became in 1969 an assistant curator at San Francisco's California Academy of Sciences herbarium. For his entire career he was employed by the California Academy of Sciences, where he was promoted to associate curator, chaired the botany department, and retired as curator emeritus and a lifetime fellow.

In 1960 Breedlove began working with ethnographer, anthropologist, and linguist Robert M. Laughlin to compile a comprehensive ethnobotanical inventory of the plants known to the Tzotzils living in the municipality of Zinacantán in the highlands Chiapas.

In 1964 Breedlove (who could speak Tzeltal Mayan), Brent Berlin, and Peter H. Raven began 10 years of ethnobotanical research among the Tzeltals and other Maya peoples in the highlands of Chiapas. Their 660-page book Principles of Tzeltal Plant Classification was published in 1974 with a paperback reprint in 2013.

San Francisco Botanical Garden's Apulca pines, which can grow to over 45 meters, were grown from seed brought back to San Francisco by Breedlove in 1986.

Deppea splendens is a synonym of Csapodya splendens.

In 1968 a species of lizard Anolis breedlovei (junior synonym of Anolis cuprinus) was named in honor of Dennis Breedlove.

Selected publications

Articles

Books

References

External links

1939 births
2012 deaths
20th-century American botanists
21st-century American botanists
Ethnobotanists
Plant collectors
University of California, Santa Barbara alumni
Stanford University alumni
People associated with the California Academy of Sciences